James Andrews (born May 2, 1942) is an American orthopedic surgeon. He is a surgeon for knee, elbow, and shoulder injuries and is a specialist in repairing damaged ligaments. Practicing in Gulf Breeze, Florida, Andrews has become one of the best-known and most popular orthopedic surgeons and has performed on many high-profile athletes. He also is the team doctor for the Tampa Bay Rays, Auburn Tigers, and Washington Commanders.

Career and education 
Andrews received his undergraduate and medical degrees from Louisiana State University, where he was an athlete, winning a Southeastern Conference Championship in polevaulting. He completed his residency at Tulane Medical School and completed fellowships at the University of Virginia School of Medicine and the University of Lyon.

Andrews is known for performing orthopedic surgery on high-profile athletes from a wide array of sports.

Andrews has co-founded or chaired multiple research bodies and medical centers, including the Andrews Sports Medicine and Orthopedic Center in Birmingham, Alabama, the American Sports Medicine Institute (ASMI), the Andrews Institute in Gulf Breeze, Florida, and the Andrews Research and Education Foundation. He created the HealthSouth Sports Medicine Council and was behind the Go For It! Roadshow. He serves on the medical advisory board for Tenex Health, Inc., a medical device company that manufactures and markets the Tenex Health TX System for the treatment of chronic tendon and fascia pain.

Notable patients 
Andrews has performed surgery on many high-profile athletes. He first became known among athletes when Roger Clemens' agent advised the pitcher to visit Andrews in 1985. Andrews provided a second opinion to team doctors, performed a successful surgery on a torn labrum, and Clemens made a full recovery. Andrews would gain a reputation as an "athlete-centric" doctor, operating on athletes including Drew Brees, Bo Jackson, Michael Jordan, Jack Nicklaus, John Smoltz, Triple H, Brett Favre, Chris Godwin, Chase Young, Marcus Lattimore, and Adrian Peterson. Unusually he treated two baseball players with the same name, Brady Feigl who both had the same injury and both are strong look a likes to one another.

References

External links 
Andrews Sports Medicine and Orthopaedic Center
Andrews Institute
Dr. Stephen Courtney

1942 births
Living people
American orthopedic surgeons
American sports physicians
Physicians from Birmingham, Alabama
People from Mountain Brook, Alabama
LSU Tigers track and field athletes
Tulane University School of Medicine alumni
People from Homer, Louisiana